Simone Benmussa (5 June 1932 – 4 June 2001) was an Algerian born writer and theatre director in France. One of her best known plays was The Singular Life of Albert Nobbs

Biography
She was born into a Jewish family in Tunis and attended the private Catholic school Notre-Dame de Sion there. She studied philosophy at the Sorbonne and also attended Sciences Po. She went on to work at various theatres with Jean-Louis Barrault. When French president Charles De Gaulle removed Barrault from the directorship of the Odéon-Théâtre de l'Europe because of his support for the student revolt of 1968, Benmussa was put in charge of theatrical works at publisher Éditions Gallimard.

Although she wrote her own play narratives, Benmussa was perhaps best known for her play The Singular Life of Albert Nobbs, which was based on a short story by George Moore. Her play was translated into English and performed in London and New York City. She also developed plays from the works of Henry James, Sigmund Freud, Virginia Woolf, Tolstoy, Nathalie Sarraute, Edith Wharton, Gertrude Stein and others.

She published several books and produced a documentary film Regards sur Nathalie Sarraute in 1978

Benmussa died of cancer at the age of 68.

Publications
 Eugène Ionesco, essays (1966)
 Le Prince répète le prince, novel (1984)
 Qui êtes-vous, Nathalie Sarraute, essays (1987)

References 

1932 births
2001 deaths
French women dramatists and playwrights
French theatre directors
French feminists
20th-century French women